Bruno Dallansky (19 September 1928 – 5 August 2008) was an Austrian actor who was best known for his roles on television and stage.

In addition to his film and stage appearances, Dallansky taught acting at the Max Reinhardt Seminar in Vienna from 1965 until 1990. He also headed the Otto Falckenberg School in Munich, Germany from 1979 until 1983.

Dallansky was married to actress Judith Holzmeister from 1955 until 1961 and the couple had one child. Dallansky and Holzmeister separated in 1961, but never divorced. Holzmeister died on 23 June 2008. Dallansky died a few weeks later in Vienna (5 August 2008).

Filmography
 1955: Dunja 
1957: And Lead Us Not Into Temptation
1958: Night Nurse Ingeborg 
1969: Seven Days Grace
1971: Und Jimmy ging zum Regenbogen
1974: Der Abituriententag (TV)
1975: The Condemned (TV)
1975: Derrick - Season 2, Episode 10: "Kamillas junger Freund" (TV)
1977: Der Bauer und der Millionär (TV)
1979: Der Lebemann (TV)
1979: Derrick - Season 6, Episode 10: "Das dritte Opfer" (TV)
1980: Ein Abend mit Labiche (TV)
1981: Der Mond ist nur a nackerte Kugel
1981:  (TV)
1982: Derrick - Season 9, Episode 4: "Die Fahrt nach Lindau" (TV)
1983: Der stille Ozean (TV)
1984: Waldheimat (TV)
1985: Via Mala (TV)
1988: Der Bierkönig (TV)
1994:  (TV)
2002: Gebürtig

References

External links

Kurier: Actor Bruno Dallansky dies 
ORF: Bruno Dallansky dies 

1928 births
2008 deaths
Male actors from Vienna
20th-century Austrian male actors
Austrian male stage actors
Austrian male television actors